Satyo Husodo (born February 22, 1983) is an Indonesian footballer that currently plays for PS Barito Putera in the Liga Indonesia Premier Division (LI).

Club statistics

References

External links

1983 births
Association football forwards
Living people
Indonesian footballers
Liga 1 (Indonesia) players
Deltras F.C. players
Gresik United players
Indonesian Premier Division players
Mitra Kukar players
Persewangi Banyuwangi players
PS Barito Putera players